Lambton College is a publicly funded college in Sarnia, Ontario, Canada. It has approximately 3,500 full-time students, 6,500 part-time students and 3,500 international students worldwide. Lambton College also has campuses in Mississauga and Toronto.

Programs
Lambton College has more than 70 post-secondary programs and apprenticeships, academic upgrading, post-graduate, part-time and training programs. The college also has pathways that lead to credentialing.

Academic Schools:
 School of Technology & Trades
 School of Business & International Education
 School of Health, Community Services & Creative Design
 School of Fire Sciences
 School of Information Technology
 Online Education

Buildings and features
The NOVA Chemicals Health & Research Centre was officially opened in May 2019. The facility is home to all Health Sciences programming labs and advanced technology simulation facilities. The Athletics & Fitness Complex opened in October 2018, and has a 15,000 sq. ft. double gymnasium with seating for 1,241 fans.

Centre of Excellence in Energy & Bio-Industrial Technologies was designed to bring together academic programming, industry-standard training, and research labs. The official opening took place in September 2018 after a two-year, $14.2 million upgrade of the 34,000 sq. ft. facility, which also included the addition of 7,000 sq. ft. of training space.

Creations Fine Dining is an on-campus restaurant and is an applied learning environment for the Hospitality & Tourism Management and Culinary Management programs.
The Early Childhood Education Centre is a college training facility used by the Early Childhood Education program. It hosts Ontario Early Years Centre, now known as EarlyON. It is scheduled to close in July 2014.
Formerly known as the Fire & Public Safety Centre of Excellence, the campus was rebranded as The Fire School in spring 2019. It is an $11-million facility featuring a two-story structure with classrooms, a triple-truck bay, a fire tower and training props.
The Skilled Trades Training Centre provides skilled trades and apprenticeship training with classrooms, and labs and facilities.
The Sustainable Smart Home is a $1.2 million building, featuring a cutting-edge energy management system, used for applied research and learning.
The SPA at Lambton is a teaching facility and a full-service spa, the spa is run and managed by students in Lambton's Esthetician and Hairstylist programs.

Student life
Lambton's Residence houses over 280 students and is located on campus. It includes a courtyard and a student lounge.
Esports Arena on campus was the first of its kind at a Canadian college.
The new Athletics & Fitness Complex features a brand new Fitness Room that is free for students.
Enactus Lambton is a student group, formed in early 2012, and were crowned World Champions at the 2018 Enactus World Cup, which took place in San Jose, California.
The Lambton College team competed with 30 other international college and university teams before the finals where they faced Egypt, India, and Morocco. They're the first Canadian College to ever take home the top prize.

History
In 1966, Lambton College was the second college in the Ontario college system to officially open. At this time 45 students were enrolled in five programs at the college. The main campus' cornerstone was dedicated on June 4, 1970. The cornerstone is a time capsule containing coins, bills, stamps, the college calendar for 1970–71, a copy of the school's charter, the school seal, a copy of the land deed for the college among other items.
The first president of Lambton College was Wolfgang Franke. He started full-time duties in January 1967 and his starting salary was $18,000. The first faculty tour of the original site was delayed because the building housing the classrooms was locked and no one had the key. Faculty member Ron Lawrence discovered (much to his dismay) that his house key fit the lock.
In 1975 a sculpture commissioned by the school, Homage, was constructed by artist Haydn Davies. The college destroyed the sculpture in 2005. The destruction of the sculpture has been controversial and was the subject of a lawsuit settled in 2010.

International
Lambton's international programming began in 1996 with an initiative in China. The international department at Lambton now includes campuses in China, Nigeria and Saudi Arabia and there are between 380 and 500 international students on-campus and 3,500 at international campuses.

Scholarships and bursaries
Lambton College offers a variety of scholarships and bursaries. Lambton College scholarships for Aboriginal, First Nations and Métis students include: Aboriginal Post Secondary Education & Training Bursary.

Notable alumni
 Judy Foote
 Isaac Jackson
 Big C
 Dicky Moore
 Phil Maness
 Rob Hughes

See also
 Canadian government scientific research organizations
 Canadian industrial research and development organizations
 Canadian Interuniversity Sport
 Canadian university scientific research organizations
 Higher education in Ontario
 List of colleges in Ontario

References

External links

1967 establishments in Ontario
Colleges in Ontario
Educational institutions established in 1967
Education in Sarnia
Buildings and structures in Sarnia